Abercrychan is a small village in the north-east of Carmarthenshire.

The village is named after the River Crychan, a small stream that flows into the River Brân, near the village. Crychan Forest is on the slopes to the east of Abercrychan.

Villages in Carmarthenshire